Melissa Marsh (born 28 May 1985) is an Australian former professional basketball player. She spent her whole career playing in the Women's National Basketball League (WNBL) and State Basketball League (SBL).

Basketball career
Marsh played in the WNBL from 2000/01 to 2013/14 for the Perth Lynx / West Coast Waves (2000–2005 and 2006–2014) and Adelaide Fellas (2005/06). She also played for the Willetton Tigers in the SBL from 2000 to 2004 and 2007 to 2015. She played 266 WNBL games and over 250 SBL games. She retired from the WNBL in February 2014.

With the Willetton Tigers, Marsh won championships in 2004, 2009, 2010, 2011.

In August 2022, Marsh was inducted into the Basketball WA Hall of Fame.

Personal life
Marsh's father Geoffrey, and brothers Shaun and Mitchell, have all represented the Australian national cricket team.

References

External links
WNBL profile
2022 Basketball WA Hall of Fame Inductee interview

1985 births
Living people
Australian women's basketball players
Perth Lynx players
Me
Basketball players from Perth, Western Australia
Sportswomen from Western Australia